John Wayne Parsons (born August 26, 1944 in Van Nuys, California) is an American race car driver. He is the son of 1950 Indianapolis 500 winner Johnnie Parsons. He drove Indy cars in the USAC National Championship, and also drove USAC championship dirt cars. Parsons made twelve starts at the Indianapolis 500, with a best finish of 5th in 1977 and 1985.

Racing career
Parsons started twelve Indianapolis 500 races. His last Indy 500 start was the 1996 race. 

Parsons finished second in the 1977 USAC National points. Parsons has also twice finished second in the USAC championship dirt cars.

Parsons won 29 midget car features (as of 1994), including major wins at: the 4-Crown Nationals midget car feature twice, the 1979 Hut Hundred, and the 1986 Copper World Classic midget feature. He has won two Silver Crown and five sprint car features.

When Davey Hamilton decided to come out of retirement to run in the 2007 Indy 500, Parsons replaced him as the driver expert for the Indianapolis Motor Speedway Radio Network's broadcasts of race activities.

Racing family
Johnny Parsons is the son of Johnnie Parsons and Arza Parsons (née Mitchell). His parents divorced, and Johnny was raised with half-brothers Dana Carter and Duane "Pancho" Carter Jr., the product of Arza's marriage with Duane Carter Sr. The Carters grew up racing quarter-midgets in Indianapolis. His first name is spelled differently than his father's. Though not his legal name, he was sometimes referred to in the media as "Johnny Parsons Jr." to distinguish him from his father.

Career award
Parsons was inducted in the National Midget Auto Racing Hall of Fame in 1994.

Racing record

Complete USAC Mini-Indy Series results

IRL IndyCar Series

Indianapolis 500 results

References

1944 births
Living people
American racing drivers
Champ Car drivers
Indianapolis 500 drivers
IndyCar Series drivers
People from Van Nuys, Los Angeles
Racing drivers from California
Racing drivers from Los Angeles
USAC Silver Crown Series drivers